Kévin Keben Biakolo (born 26 January 2004) is a Cameroonian professional footballer who plays as a centre-back for Toulouse.

Career
Born in Bertoua, Cameroon, Keben moved to France at the age of 2 and at 5 started playing football at Toulouse Montaudran. At the age of 10, he joined the youth academy of Toulouse and started working his way up their youth sides. He was promoted to their reserves in 2021, and represented the senior side in a Coupe de France match over Aubagne. On 1 February 2022, he signed his first professional contract with Toulouse. On 7 August 2022, he made his professional debut with Toulouse in a 1–1 Ligue 1 tie with OGC Nice, coming on as a substitute in the 79th minute.

References

External links
 
 

2004 births
Living people
People from Bertoua
Cameroonian footballers
Association football forwards
Ligue 1 players
Championnat National 3 players
Toulouse FC players
Cameroonian expatriate footballers
Cameroonian expatriate sportspeople in France
Expatriate footballers in France